The British Cartoonists' Association is an association of British Cartoonists. The BCA awards the annual Young Cartoonist of the Year Award which is presented at the annual Cartoon Art Trust Awards, hosted by the Cartoon Art Trust at the Cartoon Museum in London, England. The Chair is the cartoonist Nicola Jennings  and the secretary is the cartoonist Kasia Kowalska.

History
The BCA was co-founded in the 1960s by a number of cartoonists including Ken Mahood, who drew cartoons for Punch Magazine, The Times and the Daily Mail, and John Jensen.

Among its current members is the cartoonist Oliver Preston, chair of the Cartoon Art Trust which owns and operates the Cartoon Museum. Also a member is the cartoonist Sally Artz, who has served as vice-president; Sally was also a founder member of the Cartoonists' Club of Great Britain.Nicola Jennings is the current chair of the British Cartoonist's Association.

See also
 Cartoon Art Trust
 Cartoon Art Trust Awards
 Cartoon Museum
 The Cartoonists' Club of Great Britain
 Society of Strip Illustration

References

External links
 BCA at the official Procartoonist site Retrieved 21 May 2018

Arts organisations based in the United Kingdom